The Prince and Betty is a lost 1919 American silent comedy film directed by Robert Thornby. It features Boris Karloff in an uncredited role. It is based on the 1912 novel The Prince and Betty written by P. G. Wodehouse.

Plot
As described in a film magazine, Benjamin Scobell (Taylor), possessed of the idea that he can make the Principality of Merve more famous than Monte Carlo, if properly advertised, employs the American John Maude (Desmond) to impersonate a prince and start a revolution. John, anxious to marry the wealthy Betty Keith (Thurman) but temporarily out of funds, accepts the assignment. Later he learns that Betty is the stepdaughter of Scobell and that she disapproves of his method of obtaining a livelihood, which upsets his plan completely. After the plot thickens, John and Betty make their escape from Merve to the United States and Scobell, finding John a resourceful fellow, employs him to look after his vast estate.

Cast
 William Desmond as John Maude
 Mary Thurman as Betty Keith
 Anita Kay as Mrs. Jack Wheldon
 George Swann as Lord Hayling
 Walter Perry as President of Mervo
 Wilton Taylor as Benjamin Scobell
 William De Vaull as Crump
 Frank Lanning as The Shepherd
 Boris Karloff as Undetermined Role

See also
 Boris Karloff filmography

References

External links

Wodehouse, P. G. (1912), The Prince and Betty, New York: W. J. Watt & Co., on the Internet Archive

1919 films
1919 comedy films
1919 lost films
Silent American comedy films
American silent feature films
American black-and-white films
Films directed by Robert Thornby
Films based on British novels
Films based on works by P. G. Wodehouse
Lost American films
Pathé Exchange films
Lost comedy films
1910s American films